The Nürburgring 24 Hours is a 24-hour annual touring car and GT endurance racing event that takes place on a combination of the Nordschleife ("North Loop") and the GP-Strecke ("Grand Prix track") circuits of the Nürburgring in Rhineland-Palatinate, Germany. Held since 1970, over  lap length allows more than 200 cars and over 700 drivers to participate.

Although affectionately known as "The 24 Hours of Nürburgring", the race is commonly named after the official naming partner. As of 2022, the French oil and gas company, TotalEnergies (formerly Total), is the official naming partner; with the event currently labelled, the "ADAC TotalEnergies 24 Hour Race".

Overview

Officially called "ADAC 24h Rennen Nürburgring" in German ('ADAC 24 hour Race Nürburgring'), it was introduced in 1970 by the ADAC as an official race, unlike the earlier endurance contests that covered 12, 24 (in 1961 and 1967), 36, 84 and even 96 hours, like the Marathon de la Route. This substitute for the Liège-Rome-Liège and Liège-Sofia-Liège rallies was held on the Nürburgring from 1965 to 1971.

It is similar to the Spa 24 Hours, which had been introduced in 1924, following the 24 Hours of Le Mans. The ADAC had held its first 1000 km Nürburgring sports car racing event in 1953. As the 1000 km Spa had been introduced in 1966, the 24h at the Ring gave both circuits a pair of endurance racing events at very long tracks, at least until Spa was shortened in 1979.

Just like the VLN series with its 4-hour races, the 24h race is mainly aimed at amateurs, in order to fill a starting field of around 200 cars. Unlike the VLN races, the 24h is officially an international event, with bilingual (German and English) organization and documentation. Typical entries range from second hand standard road cars to European Touring Car Championship vehicles and GT3 sports cars like the Porsche 911 GT3. The participation of manufactures and professional teams and drivers has varied over the decades. As spectator numbers had dropped in the 1990s when only rather standard FIA Group N cars competed, more spectacular vehicles were admitted since 1999, like the Zakspeed Chrysler Viper GTS-R which originally was built by Oreca to FIA GT2-spec, turbo-charged Porsche, modified Deutsche Tourenwagen Masters cars from Opel and Abt Sportsline-Audi, and the Schnitzer Motorsport-entered BMW M3 GTR V8 that had been run in the 2001 American Le Mans Series.

As this section and its large paved run-off areas was useful as extra paddock zone for the competitors of the support races, it is bypassed with a sharp Z-shape chicane since 2005 for a  track length.

For practice, 230 cars are allowed, 210 qualify for the race, driven by 800 or more drivers, as 2, 3 or 4 can share a car. One driver is allowed to drive 150 minutes non-stop, and can enter on two cars, yet a rest time of at least 2 hours has to be observed between two turns of the same driver.

The 2020 race was held with limited spectators, restricted to the Grand Prix course area (initially planned to be held behind closed doors) due to the COVID-19 pandemic.

History

2006 race 
Unlike the two previous races, held on Ascension Day weekend in May in rainy and very cold weather, the 2006 event was run in warm, sunny and dry conditions on Corpus Christi (feast) weekend of June 17–18. Pure factory teams that challenged for the overall win were absent, yet Aston Martin and Maserati had entered factory-backed cars to promote their products, reminding of three overall wins each in the 1000 km Nürburgring decades ago. The Aston Martin car with Aston CEO Ulrich Bez finished 4th in class and 24th overall.

Due to good conditions and stiff competition by similar cars, a new overall distance record ( in 151 laps) was scored by the Porsche 996 GT3 of Manthey Racing that already had been the best privateer team in the previous three years. This team is partially supported by Porsche, though, with factory drivers, a 3.8L  engine and a sequential gear box. Second place finishers Jürgen Alzen/Uwe Alzen/Klaus Ludwig/Christian Abt of team Jürgen Alzen Motorsport was only one lap down and have beaten the old record, too. They used a conventional gear box and a privately built 3.8L 500PS engine. The third of three fastest Porsche, the Wolfgang Land Motorsport 911, had suffered a fiery failure of its standard 3.6L Porsche 911 GT3-RSR race engine after 21 hours, yet was classified as 14th with 133 laps.

A remarkable 5th place overall was scored by a BMW 120d, which had roughly half the power of some of the cars it beat. It was driven by Claudia Hürtgen (2005 VLN champion), Marc Hennerici (2005 privateer WTCC champion), Johannes Stuck (son of Hans-Joachim Stuck) and team owner Torsten Schubert.

2007 race 

For the 2007 event held on Corpus Christi weekend of June 7–10, more than 260 teams had applied for the 220 race entries. Prior to the start which had been scheduled for 15:00, an approaching thunderstorm made the organizers delay the beginning of the race. Lightning struck the camp of fans, injuring several, while heavy rain made the track muddy. At 16:51, the race was started after two laps behind a safety car. Veteran Klaus Ludwig at the wheel of the Aston Martin DBRS9 which had been given the number 007 took the lead in wet conditions, but hesitating too long with the change to dry tyres, the favorite Manthey team took the lead in their new Porsche 997 GT3-RSR. More weather-related drama occurred in the night, when the race was interrupted due to fog for six hours, making the race 18 hours.

When the race resumed, the Land Porsche 996 GT3-RSR was slightly damaged when hitting the back of the Manthey car, and the Aston Martin engine failed. Thus the Manthey team could easily defend its 2006 victory. The reliable, yet no more fast enough Zakspeed Dodge Viper GTS-R came in second, with the Alzen brothers Porsche Cayman in 4th and the BMW Z4 M-Coupe 5th.

Remarkable performances were the top ten finishes of a VW Golf 5, an Opel Astra GTC and a BMW 130i, and the 13th place of a Hyundai Coupe V6 piloted by ex British Touring Car racer Peter Cate.

2008 race 

For the 2008, over 270 cars were entered, of which only 230 could be accepted. The race began in sunny weather with drama for the favorite Porsche teams of Manthey and Land, losing time with a leaky radiator and a tire failure, and the new Alzen 997 Turbo and the Zakspeed Viper battling for the lead. After the Viper was out, only the BMW Z4 (E85) of Claudia Hürtgen, pole setter and winner of the recent VLN race, could challenge the Porsche armada and lead for some laps, but it crashed during the night.

Manthey could catch up and win the race for a third time in a row, with the winning car of 2006 (a 996 model) finishing 2nd. The triumph made the team mechanics cut off Olaf Manthey's famous moustache tips. Sabine Schmitz came in third, also on a Porsche 997. A strong showing among the high powered cars gave the three new Volkswagen Scirocco, finishing 9th and 12th, with veteran Hans Joachim Stuck driving both cars.

2009 race 

For 2009, the organizers announced that they wanted to reduce the gap in speeds, by not accepting small capacity cars any more, and by slowing down the fastest classes, SP7 and SP8. Also, the new FIA GT3 and FIA GT4 classes were adopted, called SP9 and SP10. Some of the new rules are controversial, especially the fact that instead of the regular fuel pumps as used in any public station, the top teams have to use expensive equipment designed to equal the times needed to refill, meaning that an economic car is punished compared to a thirsty car. Due to the various rule changes, some teams have declined to take part, namely Zakspeed with their Viper.

Probably also due to the economic crisis, the number of entries is much lower than in previous years, with only 170 cars starting the race. Surprisingly, the pole was set by a Ford GT, followed closely by the four factory-entered Audi R8 LMS and two Porsche GT3 of the Manthey team. They have decided to enter their well-known RSR, which is basically a GT2 car, but now has about 70 hp less due to new air restrictors, and also a 997 GT3 Cup S, the version Porsche homologated for FIA GT3. For the first 19 hours, two of the Audis and the two Manthey Porsche battled for the lead within a lap, the pace likely to result in a new distance record. The Manthey #1 had been punished for approaching an accident site too quickly and had to wait 3 minutes in the box, but the decision was reverted later based on data logging evidence, with the lost time deducted from the results. Around 11:30, the #99 Audi which had a narrow lead was stopped by suspension problems. Following repairs this car finished in 5th position. This left the #97 Audi in second, and with the win in its class, 5 minutes behind the overall winner.

2010 race 

The 2010 event on Ascension Day weekend of May 13–16 saw a return of most prominent entries, except the Ford GT, as team Raeder had discontinued this project. To give teams time to rest or for repairs before the race, the night practice was scheduled on Thursday evening. In cold and wet conditions, the Farnbacher-entered Ferrari F430 GTC set the best lap time before the session was red-flagged due to fog. In Friday afternoon qualifying, held in fair weather, it crashed out and was barely repaired in time for the race. With lap times around 8:29, three of Porsche's new SP9/GT3-class cars occupied places 5 to 7, two of them entered by four-time winner Team Manthey, which had chosen to let the #1 car do only a single lap. BMW had entered two of their ALMS BMW M3 GT2, run by Schnitzer Motorsport. Due to the modifications that include a transaxle gear box, they do not comply to the standard rules set of SP classes and their "Balance of Performance". Along with a factory-entered Porsche GT3 Hybrid, the M3s were classed as E1-XP entries (the E1-XP class was actually intended for experimental factory entries). The better BMW and the Hybrid posted times of 8:32 and 8:34 in qualifying. Save for the 16th placed GT3-class Dodge Viper, only several other Porsche, Audi R8 and V8-powered BMW Z4 (E89)#BMW Z4 GT3 (2010-2015) have qualified in the top 20, with times up to 8:47, which earns them a blue flash light that is supposed to facilitate passing of the approx. 180 slower cars.

Porsche test driver Walter Röhrl had intended to enter on a standard road legal Porsche 911 GT3 RS, but had to withdraw due to health reasons from the team that comprises racers Roland Asch and Patrick Simon, plus journalists Horst von Saurma and Chris Harris. The car, entered in cooperation with sport auto (Germany), is registered as S-GO 2400, and was driven from Weissach to Nürburg. It has qualified with 9:15, 42nd overall, and 9th among the 17 SP7 class entrants, only beaten by its race-prepped Porsche 997 siblings.

The race was started on Saturday 3 p.m. in sunny but cold weather. Already on the Grand Prix track, the #1 Manthey Porsche driven by five-time winner Marcel Tiemann passed all Audis, taking the lead and pulling away about  before catching up in lap 2 with the slowest cars of the third group, which were still in their first lap. After lap 3, three Porsche lead ahead of three Audi, a BMW M3 and the Hybrid-Porsche, which due to his larger range could take the lead after the others pitted. The #1 Manthey Porsche led by a couple of minutes until got involved in a collision after seven hours. At halftime, the race is on pace to another distance record, with the Audi #99 leading by a small margin ahead of the Hybrid Porsche, the only remaining representative of his brand in the top 8, which used to be dominated by Porsche in recent years. Places three to eight were occupied by three Audi R8, two BMW, and, rather surprisingly, on p 5 the Ferrari which had started in row 21. The Porsches that occupy most places up to 15th were followed by the CNG-powered Volkswagen Scirocco GT24, the road-legal Porsche GT3 RS and a Nissan Z33. On Sunday morning, the #99 Audi needed a rear axle change, and with less than 5 hours to go, also the second place #2 Audi failed. This left the Hybrid Porsche in a one lap lead ahead of the #25 BMW GT2 with gearbox woes and the Ferrari, until also the Porsche stopped with less than two hours to go. The BMW made it to the finish, giving Pedro Lamy a record-tying fifth win ahead of Ferrari and Audi. The best Porsche, entered by Alzen, finished only sixth, six laps ahead of the Falken Nissan and the road legal GT3.

The SP4 class was won by 4 Argentinian drivers in the BMW 325i E92 Coupe of Motorsport Team Sorg Rennsport. This was the first victory for an Argentinian team at the Nürburgring 24 Hours race and the first Argentinian team to compete in the Nürburgring since Juan Manuel Fangio.

2011 race 

With Corpus Christi weekend being rather late in 2011 on June 23–26, the 2011 event was held two weeks after the 2011 24 Hours of Le Mans. The first five VLN races of 2011 were won by a factory-entered BMW, a GT3-class Mercedes SLS, a new Ferrari 458, the Hybrid Porsche GT3 and finally an Audi R8 LMS, so at least these five different brands were expected to challenge for the overall win in the 24 hours. In the first qualifying session, the Hankook-sponsored Farnbacher-Ferrari used soft tyres and was about 7 seconds faster than the competitors, lapping at an average speed of over 181 km/h, the fastest since 1983. This earned the team the pole position, but also an extra weight of 25 kg in the pre-race update of the ‘Balance of Performance’. Team Manthey decided to find out in the early stages of the race which class was more effective under the current conditions, entering their four Porsche factory drivers on two yellow and green Porsche 997 GT3: two pilots shared the #11 SP9/GT3-spec ‘R’, which had more power and qualified 8th, two others the #18 SP7/GT2-class ‘RSR’, which had more downforce, but was only 16th on the grid. After a few hours in changing weather conditions, the team retired the ‘R’ to focus on the ‘RSR’ which already had won three times since 2007. Without any problems, it went on to win its fourth Nürburgring 24 Hours, with a new distance record of 156 laps. Second place was taken by another GT2-spec car, the #1 factory BMW M3 GT which had won in 2010. Five GT3 cars of Audi and Mercedes followed. The SP8/GT2-class #2 Ferrari had run into early problems, but set the fastest race lap in the final hours, finishing 8th and James Glickenhaus’ P4/5 Competizione finished 39th, second in the E1-XP2.

After 2010 Sorg Rennsport took the victory in class SP4 again. Gianvito Rossi, Diego Romanini, Alfredo Varini and Alexander Rappold have been the only team in that class.

2012 race 

The 40th ADAC Zurich 24-Hour Race ran on Saturday, May 19, 14:00 to Sunday, May 20, 2012, 14:00.

The 2012 event was the first to have a "Top 40" qualifying shootout for the 40 fastest cars on the starting grid, which took place on the Friday after the first 2 qualifying sessions.

The #3 Phoenix Racing Team won the race in an Audi R8 LMS.

2013 race

The 2013 race saw Aston Martin's hydrogen powered car run the first ever zero-emissions lap of the circuit. The race also saw the first ever win for a Mercedes.

The #9 Team Black Falcon won the race in a Mercedes-AMG GT3.

2014 race

The 2014 race set a new record for the total distance driven during a Nürburgring 24-hour race with 4,035 km (159 laps) driven by the top two cars.

The #4 Phoenix Racing Team won the race in an Audi R8 LMS.

2015 race 

The #28 Audi Sport Team WRT won the race in an Audi R8 LMS.

2016 race

The #4 AMG-Team Black Falcon won the race in a Mercedes-AMG GT3. Mercedes took 1-2-3-4 finish.

2017 race

The #29 Audi Sport Team Land / Montaplast Land-Motorsport Team won the race in an Audi R8 LMS.

2018 race

The #912 Manthey Racing Team won the race in a Porsche 911 GT3 R.

2019 race

The #4 Phoenix Racing Team won the race in an Audi R8 LMS Evo.

2020 race

Traditionally held in May, it was announced on March that the race will be postponed to September 24–27 due to the COVID-19 pandemic. The event was initially planned to be held behind closed doors, but later a limited amount of spectators were admitted. Rowe Racing (BMW M6 GT3) won the event, the first for BMW in 10 years, although the race was interrupted for most of the night due to inclement weather.

2021 race

The 2021 race was won by the Porsche-based Manthey Racing, who was forced to sit out the previous year's race due to COVID-19 concerns involving the team crew. A new record low of 58 laps (and less than ten hours of actual racing) was covered, as the race was once again interrupted for most of the night due to inclement weather.

2022 race

The 50th anniversary 2022 race took place on 28–29 May 2022. A total of 159 laps were completed by the winning car #15 from Scherer Sport Team Phoenix.

Winners

Records

Multiple overall wins by driver

Overall wins by manufacturer

See also 
 List of Nordschleife lap times (racing)

References

External links 
 
 Information about the event on the official Nürburgring-website
 Road to 24h race Nürburgring Nordschleife 2012

 
1970 establishments in West Germany
Recurring sporting events established in 1970
Group GT3
GT4 (sports car class)